Jennite is a calcium silicate hydrate mineral of general chemical formula: Ca9Si6O18(OH)6·8H2O. 

Jennite occurs as an alteration mineral in metamorphosed limestone and skarn. It typically occurs as vein and open space fillings as a late mineral phase.  It also occurs in hydrated cement paste. 

A first specimen of jennite found in 1966 at the Crestmore quarries (Crestmore, Riverside County, California, US) was analysed and identified as a new mineral by Carpenter in 1966 (Carpenter, 1966). They named it in honor of its discoverer: Clarence Marvin Jenni (1896–1973) director of the Geological Museum at the University of Missouri.

In contrast to the first analysis made by Carpenter, jennite was found to not contain appreciable amount of sodium  when the Crestmore specimen was reexamined. 

The structure of jennite is made of three distinct modules: ribbons of edge-sharing calcium octahedra, silicate chains of wollastonite-type running along the b axis, and additional calcium octahedra on inversion centers. The hydroxyl groups are bonded to three calcium cations while no SiOH groups are observed.
 

Cement chemistry

Jennite is often used in thermodynamical calculations to represent the pole of the less evolved calcium silicate hydrate (C-S-H). The value of its atomic Ca/Si or molecular CaO/SiO2 (C/S) ratio is 1.50 (9/6), as directly calculated from its elementary composition formula. Tobermorite represents the more evolved pole with a C/S ratio of 0.83 (5/6).

See also

 Other calcium silicate hydrate (C-S-H) minerals:
 Afwillite
 Gyrolite
 Thaumasite
 Tobermorite
 Other calcium aluminium silicate hydrate, (C-A-S-H) minerals:
 Tacharanite
 Hydrogarnet
 Hydrogrossular
 Hydrotalcite
 Katoite

References

Bibliography

Further reading
 
 
 
 

Calcium compounds
Calcium minerals
Cement
Crestmore Heights, California
Geology of Riverside County, California
Hydrates
Inosilicates
Minerals in space group 2
Triclinic minerals